Hirooka (written: 広岡 or 廣岡) is a Japanese surname. Notable people with the surname include:

, Japanese businesswoman, banker and college founder
, Japanese footballer
, Japanese baseball player
, Japanese baseball player

See also
Hirooka Station, a railway station in Shiojiri, Nagano Prefecture, Japan

Japanese-language surnames